Greece competed at the 2016 Summer Olympics in Rio de Janeiro, Brazil, from 5 to 21 August 2016. Greek athletes have competed in every Summer Olympic Games of the modern era, alongside Australia, France, Great Britain, and Switzerland. As the progenitor nation of the Olympic Games and in keeping with tradition, Greece entered first at the Maracanã Stadium during the opening ceremony.

The Hellenic Olympic Committee confirmed a roster of 93 athletes, 56 men and 37 women, to compete across 15 sports at the Games, the smallest in Summer Olympic history since 1992. Aquatic sports constituted the largest number of athletes on the Greek team, with a combined total of 29 entries (14 in swimming, 2 in synchronized swimming, and 13 in men's water polo). There was a single competitor each in archery, road cycling, track cycling, mountain biking, table tennis, weightlifting, and wrestling.

The Greek roster featured 36 returning Olympians, with archer Evangelia Psarra (the oldest member of the team, aged 42) and long-distance swimmer and double world open water champion Spyridon Gianniotis headed to their fifth consecutive Games as the most experienced competitors. Five Greek athletes vied for their fourth Olympic appearance, including table tennis player Panagiotis Gionis, gymnast Vlasios Maras, and judo legend Ilias Iliadis (all of whom started as members of the host nation team in Athens 2004). Sailor and two-time medalist Sofia Bekatorou, who raced alongside her partner Michail Pateniotis in the Nacra 17 class, created Summer Olympic history as the nation's first ever female flag bearer in the opening ceremony.

Greece returned home from Rio de Janeiro with six medals (three gold, one silver, and two bronze), a vast improvement on the nation's overall medal tally from the 2012 Summer Olympics in London. Anna Korakaki accomplished a historic feat as the first Greek athlete to earn multiple medals at a single Olympics since 1912, with a gold and a bronze in women's pistol shooting. The gold medal was the first one for Greece after a 12-year drought. Two other golds were awarded to gymnast Eleftherios Petrounias in the men's rings, and pole vaulter Ekaterini Stefanidi, the first for Greece in the track and field after 12 years. Gianniotis enjoyed the final race of his swimming career with a runner-up finish in the open water marathon, while Panagiotis Mantis and Pavlos Kagialis handed the Greeks their eighth Olympic medal in sailing, obtaining the bronze in the men's 470 class.

Medalists

| width=78% align=left valign=top |

| width=22% align=left valign=top |

| width=22% align=left valign=top |

Competitors
The following is the list of number of competitors participating in the Games:

Archery

Greece has received a spare Olympic berth freed up by Ivory Coast to send a female archer to the Olympics, as the Ivorian National Olympic Committee decided to withdraw its entry after the deadline. The berth was officially awarded to four-time Olympian Evangelia Psarra.

Athletics

Greek athletes have so far achieved qualifying standards in the following athletics events (up to a maximum of 3 athletes in each event):

Track & road events
Men

Women

Field events
Men

Women

Combined events – Women's heptathlon

Cycling

Road
Greece has qualified one rider in the men's Olympic road race by virtue of his top 200 individual ranking in the 2015 UCI Europe Tour.

Track
Following the completion of the 2016 UCI Track Cycling World Championships, Greece has entered one rider to compete in the men's keirin at the Olympics, by virtue of his final individual UCI Olympic ranking in that event.

Keirin

Mountain biking
Greece has qualified one mountain biker for the men's Olympic cross-country race, as a result of his nation's twenty-first-place finish in the UCI Olympic Ranking List of May 25, 2016.

Fencing

Greece has entered one fencer into the Olympic competition. 2012 Olympian Vassiliki Vougiouka claimed a spot in the women's sabre as one of the two highest-ranked fencers coming from the Europe zone in the FIE Adjusted Official Rankings. Meanwhile, Aikaterini Kontochristopoulou rounded out the Greek roster by finishing among the top four individual fencers in the women's foil at the European Zonal Qualifier in Prague, Czech Republic.

Gymnastics

Artistic
Greece has entered two artistic gymnasts into the Olympic competition. Eleftherios Petrounias won the gold medal in the men's rings to book his Olympic spot at the 2015 World Championships in Glasgow, Scotland, and was later joined by three-time Olympian Vlasios Maras and Vasiliki Millousi, who both claimed the men's and women's individual all-around spot, respectively at the Olympic Test Event in Rio de Janeiro.

Men

Women

Rhythmic 
Greece has qualified one rhythmic gymnast for the individual all-around by finishing in the top 15 at the 2015 World Championships in Stuttgart, Germany. A team of five rhythmic gymnasts were added to the Greek roster by claiming one of the three available Olympic spots in the group all-around at the Olympic Test Event in Rio de Janeiro.

Judo

Greece has qualified two judokas for each of the following weight classes at the Games. Roman Moustopoulos and double Olympic medalist Ilias Iliadis were ranked among the top 22 eligible judokas for men in the IJF World Ranking List of May 30, 2016.

Rowing

Greece has qualified two boats for each of the following rowing classes into the Olympic regatta. Rowers competing in the men's four and women's single sculls confirmed Olympic places for their boats at the 2015 FISA World Championships in Lac d'Aiguebelette, France.

On July 26, 2016, the men's lightweight four berth was awarded to the Greek rowing team, as a response to the removal of four boats held by the Russians from FISA due to their previous doping bans and their implications in the "disappearing positive methodology" set out in the McClaren Report on Russia's state-sponsored doping.

Men

Women

Qualification Legend: FA=Final A (medal); FB=Final B (non-medal); FC=Final C (non-medal); FD=Final D (non-medal); FE=Final E (non-medal); FF=Final F (non-medal); SA/B=Semifinals A/B; SC/D=Semifinals C/D; SE/F=Semifinals E/F; QF=Quarterfinals; R=Repechage

Sailing

Greek sailors have qualified one boat in each of the following classes through the 2014 ISAF Sailing World Championships, the individual fleet Worlds, and European qualifying regattas. The majority of the sailing crews, led by London 2012 fourth-place finalist Byron Kokkalanis (RS:X) and Beijing 2008 bronze medalist Sofia Bekatorou, along with her new partner Michail Pateniotis (Nacra 17), were named to the Greek team, following the completion of the Princess Sofia Trophy regatta. Meanwhile, London 2012 Olympian Ioannis Mitakis rounded out the Greek selection at the 2016 Finn Gold Cup.

Men

Women

Mixed

M = Medal race; EL = Eliminated – did not advance into the medal race

Shooting

Greek shooters have achieved quota places for the following events by virtue of their best finishes at the 2015 ISSF World Cup series, and European Championships or Games, as long as they obtained a minimum qualifying score (MQS) by March 31, 2016.

Qualification Legend: Q = Qualify for the next round; q = Qualify for the bronze medal (shotgun)

Swimming

Greek swimmers have so far achieved qualifying standards in the following events (up to a maximum of 2 swimmers in each event at the Olympic Qualifying Time (OQT), and potentially 1 at the Olympic Selection Time (OST)):

Men

Women

Synchronized swimming

Greece has fielded a squad of two synchronized swimmers to compete only in the women's duet by virtue of their fourth-place finish at the FINA Olympic test event in Rio de Janeiro.

Table tennis

Greece has entered one athlete into the table tennis competition at the Games. Panagiotis Gionis secured one of ten available Olympic spots to confirm his fourth consecutive appearance in the men's singles by winning the group final match at the European Qualification Tournament in Halmstad, Sweden.

Water polo

Summary

Men's tournament

The Greek men's water polo team qualified for the Olympics, after winning the bronze medal in the men's tournament at the 2015 FINA World Championships in Kazan, Russia.

Team roster

Group play

Quarterfinal

Classification semifinal (5–8)

Fifth place match

Weightlifting

Greece has received an unused quota place from IWF to send a male weightlifter to the Olympics.

Wrestling

Greece has qualified one wrestler for the women's freestyle 53 kg into the Olympic competition as a result of her semifinal triumph at the initial meet of the World Qualification Tournament in Ulaanbaatar.

Women's freestyle

See also
Greece at the 2016 Summer Paralympics

References

External links 

 

Olympics
2016
Nations at the 2016 Summer Olympics